The 1886 South Carolina gubernatorial election was held on November 2, 1886 to select the governor of the state of South Carolina. John Peter Richardson III was nominated by the Democrats and became the 83rd governor of South Carolina.

Democratic Convention

Ben Tillman, an upstate demagogue, sought to increase his political strength statewide by entering in a union with the editor of The News and Courier, Francis Dawson. They united behind the candidacy of Governor John Calhoun Sheppard for reelection, although Sheppard refused to accept Tillman's agriculture program. The News and Courier ran articles leading up to the convention describing the growing strength of Sheppard's campaign and by beginning of the state Democratic convention held in Columbia on August 4, the newspaper had proclaimed that Sheppard was in the lead.

On the morning of August 4, Tillman gathered the delegates from the Democratic convention who were supporters of the Farmers' Association at the Richland County courthouse and tried to bind them to a resolution to support Sheppard. The effort failed and the farmers instead adopted a resolution stating that they would not endorse any candidate for governor.

When it became public that Tillman tried to coerce support for Sheppard, a delegate from Richland County went to the floor after the initial call of the third ballot and changed his vote from Sheppard to John Peter Richardson III, a planter from Clarendon County. Immediately a stampede of other delegates changed their vote and a second call of the third ballot was taken. After this tally, Richardson received 172 votes and was declared the nominee for governor, having passed the required threshold of 159.

General election
The general election was held on November 2, 1886 and John Peter Richardson III was elected as governor of South Carolina without opposition. Being a non-presidential election and few contested races, turnout was the lowest for a gubernatorial election since the election of 1865.

 

|-
| 
| colspan=5 |Democratic hold
|-

See also
Governor of South Carolina
List of governors of South Carolina
South Carolina gubernatorial elections

Notes

References

External links
SCIway Biography of Governor John Peter Richardson III

1886 United States gubernatorial elections
1886
Gubernatorial
November 1886 events